Heinrich XIV, Prince Reuss Younger Line (28 May 183229 March 1913) was Prince Reuss Younger Line from 1867 to 1913.

Early life
Heinrich XIV was born at Coburg, Saxe-Coburg and Gotha, sixth child of Heinrich LXVII, Prince Reuss Younger Line (1789–1867), (son of Heinrich LXII, Prince Reuss Younger Line, and Princess Caroline of Hohenlohe-Kirchberg) and his wife, Princess Adelheid Reuss of Ebersdorf (1800–1880), (daughter of Heinrich LI, Prince Reuss of Ebersdorf and Countess Luise of Hoym).

Prince Reuss Younger Line
At the death of his father on 11 July 1867 he inherited the throne of the Principality.

He became regent of Reuss Elder Line from 1902, because of a physical and mental disability of Prince Heinrich XXIV due to an accident in his childhood, at his death, his son continued the regency Prince Heinrich XXVII until the abolition of the German monarchies in 1918.

In 1869 he founded the Reussian Prince Cross of Honour. (:de:Reußisches Ehrenkreuz) and in 1897 he donated a Golden Medal of Distinguish Service (de:Goldenen Verdienstmedaille).

Marriage
Heinrich XIV married on 6 February 1858 at Karlsruhe to Duchess Agnes of Württemberg (1835–1886), younger child of Duke Eugen of Württemberg by his second marriage with Princess Helene of Hohenlohe-Langenburg.

They had two children:
Heinrich XXVII, Prince Reuss Younger Line (10 November 1858 – 21 November 1928), married in 1884 to Pricess Elise of Hohenlohe-Langenburg, had issue.
Princess Elisabeth Reuss of Schleiz (27 October 1859 – 23 February 1951), married in 1887 to Prince Hermann of Solms-Braunfels, had issue.

He married secondly in a morganatic marriage on 14 February 1890 at Gera to Friederike Graetz (1851–1907), daughter of Johann Philipp Graetz and Augusta Neiss.

They had one son:
Baron Heinrich of Saalburg (4 November 1875 – 23 February 1954), married in 1924 to Margarethe Groenwoldt, no issue.

Honours

Ancestry

Notes and sources
Genealogisches Handbuch des Adels, Fürstliche Häuser, Reference: 1956
L'Allemagne dynastique, Huberty, Giraud, Magdelaine, Reference: 334

References

1832 births
1913 deaths
People from Coburg
People from Schleiz
People from Gera
Princes of Reuss
Generals of Infantry (Prussia)
Grand Crosses of the Order of Saint Stephen of Hungary
Recipients of the Order of the Cross of Takovo
Regents of Germany
Military personnel from Bavaria